Roman Baber (born 1980) is a Russian-Canadian politician who was the member of Provincial Parliament (MPP) for York Centre from 2018 to 2022. Baber was elected as a member of the Progressive Conservative Party of Ontario until he was removed by Premier Doug Ford, the party leader, in January 2021. He sat as an Independent until the dissolution of the Legislative Assembly on May 3, 2022.

He was a candidate in the 2022 leadership election of the Conservative Party of Canada.

Early life 
Baber was born and raised in the former Soviet Union. He and his family moved to Israel when he was eight, before emigrating to Canada in 1995, when he was 15.

Baber's family settled in Toronto in the Bathurst Street and Sheppard Avenue area, an area he represented. He is a lawyer by profession, and attended William Lyon Mackenzie Collegiate Institute and York University, before earning his law degree at the University of Western Ontario.

Political career 
Baber was elected as the MPP for York Centre in the 2018 provincial election.

Autism file and Baber Report 
In April 2019, Baber was asked by Premier Doug Ford to review the government's autism program. Baber's review, later termed the Baber Report, was provided anonymously to The Globe and Mail after it was shared with the government's Autism Advisory Panel. On July 29, 2019, the Ontario government apologized to the families of autistic children for the initial plan and acknowledged that the changes to the autism program announced earlier that year were poorly conceived.

Removal from PC Party 
He was a member of the Progressive Conservative Party caucus until January 15, 2021 when Premier Doug Ford removed him from caucus over his opposition to the province's lockdown and restrictions during the COVID-19 pandemic in Ontario, with Baber stating in an open letter to Premier Ford, "the lockdown is deadlier than COVID".

Baber was Chair of Parliament's Justice Policy Committee until his removal by a Government motion on February 16, 2021.

He did not run for re-election in the 2022 Ontario general election.

Federal Conservative leadership candidate 
On March 9, 2022, Baber declared his intent to run in the 2022 Conservative Party of Canada leadership election. Baber ran on a platform of restoring Canada's democracy. He inspired by his ejection from Premier Doug Ford's PC caucus, Baber pledged to allow MPs to vote their conscience and express their personal views without fear of repercussions. He pledged to oppose Quebec's Bill 21 and Bill 96, repeal the Trudeau government's carbon tax, end Canada's equalization program, phase out supply management, and more. On September 10, it was announced that Pierre Poilievre won the leadership on the first ballot. Baber placed fourth, garnering 5.03% of the points and 5.4% of the votes cast.

References

Progressive Conservative Party of Ontario MPPs
Independent MPPs in Ontario
21st-century Canadian politicians
Politicians from Toronto
Living people
1980 births
Israeli people of Russian-Jewish descent
Soviet emigrants to Israel
Soviet emigrants to Canada
Canadian people of Russian-Jewish descent
Israeli emigrants to Canada
Jewish Canadian politicians
Lawyers in Ontario
Politicians affected by a party expulsion process